Victoria Monét McCants (born May 1, 1989) is an American singer, songwriter, and record producer. She became involved in performing arts at a young age, singing in the youth choir at her church, and performing in a city dance team. She soon took to writing and began working with producer Rodney Jerkins. Previously signed to Atlantic Records, Monét released her debut EP Nightmares & Lullabies: Act 1 in 2014 and her follow-up EP Nightmares & Lullabies: Act 2 in 2015. Monét would follow this with the Life After Love, Pt. 1 and Life After Love Pt. 2 EPs in February and September 2018 respectively. Part one of her debut album, Jaguar, was released on August 7, 2020.

Monét has written songs for a number of artists including Nas, Ariana Grande, Fifth Harmony, T.I., GOOD Music, Lupe Fiasco, Chrisette Michele, Coco Jones, Chris Brown, and Dirty Money. In 2019, Monét received two Grammy Award nominations for Album of the Year for her work on Grande's Thank U, Next and Record of the Year for "7 Rings".

Early life
Monét was born in Georgia and moved to Sacramento, California, as a child. Her mother is L'Tanya Chestang-Cubit (née Lovett) and her maternal grandmother was Cassaundria Lovett of Mobile, Alabama. She has a half-brother named Michael Cubit, Jr. In Catholic elementary school, she appeared on stage in holiday plays, and in church she sang in the youth choir. In junior high school she formed her own dance group; this led to teaching at two dance studios. She attended Sheldon High School in Sacramento after pleading with her mother to change their address so that she could participate in Sheldon's performing arts program.

Career

2010–2015: Songwriting and Nightmares & Lullabies
Outside of dance rehearsals, Monét began exchanging poetry with an older cousin and found a new passion. This soon translated into her writing her own music. Meanwhile, she had been educating herself on the production world, learning about producers, and making music at a local recording studio. She learned about Rodney Jerkins (aka Darkchild) and decided to add him on Myspace. Shortly after that, he invited her to come to Los Angeles and audition for a new girl group he was forming, Purple Reign. The group landed a record deal with Motown a year later, but was dropped before releasing any music. After the group's disbandment, Monét turned to songwriting to earn money while she waited for her own music career to build up. The first song she worked on was a track for Diddy Dirty Money's 2010 album, Last Train to Paris. She continued to write song hooks and sang the demos herself before sending them out. Her hope was that the labels would like her version enough that they would keep her on the track as a feature.

Atlantic Records CEO Craig Kallman heard one of her demos in a meeting and offered her a record deal later that day. Even though she was signed, Monét acknowledged that her songwriting "took off" before her music, while she was working on both. Her songwriting remained her main form of income during the beginning of her music career. On October 30, 2014, Monét released her debut EP Nightmares & Lullabies: Act 1 and on June 17, 2015, she released her follow-up EP Nightmares & Lullabies – Act 2 under Atlantic Records. Monét chose the name as it represented the sound of the EPs: a dark beat mixed with soft melodies.

2016–2018: Life After Love and touring
Following the shootings of Alton Sterling and Philando Castile, and the Dallas Police shooting, Monét released "Better Days" with Ariana Grande on July 10, 2016. Monét joined girl group Fifth Harmony on the North American leg of the 7/27 Tour, which began on July 25, 2016, as an opening act along with pop singer JoJo. Grande joined Monét on one of the tour dates to perform "Better Days." On September 22, 2016, Grande announced on Twitter that Monét will serve as an opening act along with British girl group Little Mix on the North American leg of the Dangerous Woman Tour. Monét also supported Grande on the European leg of the tour alongside rapper Bia.

In 2016, Monét released the promotional single "Do You Like It" which was followed by the single "Ready", which was released while on tour with Ariana Grande in April 2017. Both singles would later be included on Life After Love Pt. 2. On February 23, 2018, Monét released the first half of her "Life After Love" series, Life After Love, Pt. 1. The project features the single "Freak", which was released on February 9 with the project's pre-order. A remix of the song featuring previous tour-mate Bia, was released on July 19, 2018 alongside a music video. The latter half of the "Life After Love" series, Life After Love, Pt. 2, was released on September 28, 2018, and was preceded by the single "New Love".

2019–present: Jaguar
On April 1, 2019, Victoria Monét and Ariana Grande released the single "Monopoly" while Grande was on her Sweetener World Tour. The song debuted at No. 70 on the Billboard Hot 100 becoming Monét first entry on the chart as an artist; Monét also appeared at No. 16 on Billboard's  Emerging Artists artist the same week.

In late 2019, Monét released the single "Ass Like That". The song served as the lead single to her upcoming debut project. In early 2020, Monét released the single "Moment" followed by the promotional single "Dive". Monét was announced as Apple Music's Up Next artist in February 2020. On June 19, Monét released the single "Experience" with Khalid and SG Lewis and announced her debut project, Jaguar. In an interview with Apple Music, Monét disclosed that Jaguar will be released in three separate parts which will eventually come together to form her debut studio album. Part one of Jaguar was released on August 7. On October 4, Monét released the song "Politics" exclusively on SoundCloud, leaving a portion of the song fully instrumental, so listeners could add their own feature verse to the song. On October 8, Monét released a remix of the Jaguar track "Touch Me" featuring American singer-songwriter Kehlani. In December 2020, Monét released a holiday instrumental edition of Jaguar called A Jaguar Christmas: The Orchestral Arrangements.

On February 1, 2021 Monét released the single "F.U.C.K." along with a western-themed music video. She released another single "Coastin'" on August 5, 2021 and a music video was released starring Rickey Thompson. In June 2022, Monét performed "Coastin'" at the 22nd BET Awards pre-show and announced she was working on a follow-up project to her previous EP titled Jaguar II.

Songwriting
Monét has a long history of writing songs for other artists. In 2010, she helped pen "I Hate That You Love Me" by Diddy Dirty Money and went on to co-write songs such as "Be Alright", "Let Me Love You", "Thank U, Next", and "Monopoly" (featuring Monét) by Ariana Grande; "Memories Back Then" by T.I., B.o.B and Kendrick Lamar; "Drunk Texting" by Chris Brown; "Everlasting Love", "Them Girls Be Like", "Reflection", "We Know", and "No Way" by Fifth Harmony; "You Wouldn't Understand" by Nas; "Sin City" by GOOD Music; "Visual Love" by Chrisette Michele; "Live on Tonight" by T.I.; "Do It" by Chloe x Halle; "Rather Be" by Brandy; as well as "Ice Cream" by Blackpink and Selena Gomez.

For her work with Grande she was nominated for two awards at the 62nd Annual Grammy Awards, Record of the Year for "7 Rings" and Album of the Year" for Thank U, Next. The following year she was nominated in the Best R&B Song category for co-writing Chloe x Halle's single "Do It."

Personal life
Monét came out as bisexual in 2018. In December 2020, she announced that she was pregnant with her first child. On February 21, 2021, Monét gave birth to a girl named Hazel Monét Gaines.

Discography

EPs

Singles

As lead artist

As featured artist

Promotional singles

Guest appearances

Production and songwriting

Awards and nominations

References

External links

1989 births
Living people
21st-century American women singers
African-American women singer-songwriters
American contemporary R&B singers
American women hip hop musicians
American hip hop singers
American people of French descent
American women pop singers
American rhythm and blues singer-songwriters
Atlantic Records artists
Bisexual musicians
Bisexual women
LGBT African Americans
LGBT people from California
LGBT people from Georgia (U.S. state)
American LGBT singers
Musicians from Sacramento, California
Singer-songwriters from California
21st-century American singers
20th-century LGBT people
21st-century LGBT people
21st-century African-American women singers
20th-century African-American people
20th-century African-American women
Singer-songwriters from Georgia (U.S. state)